"Whatcha Gonna Do with a Cowboy" is a song written by Garth Brooks and Mark D. Sanders, and recorded by American country music artist Chris LeDoux with Brooks. It was released in July 1992 as the first single from his album Whatcha Gonna Do with a Cowboy. The song reached number 7 on the Billboard Hot Country Singles & Tracks chart in September 1992. Brooks is featured as a duet partner, although he only received chart credit in Canada.

Critical reception
Deborah Evans Price, of Billboard magazine reviewed the song favorably, saying that intensity compensates for LeDoux's lack of vocal range. She goes on to call it a "cheeky and thoroughly engaging title tune."

Chart performance
"Whatcha Gonna Do with a Cowboy" debuted at number 49 on the U.S. Billboard Hot Country Singles & Tracks for the week of July 25, 1992.

Year-end charts

References

Songs about cowboys and cowgirls
1992 singles
Chris LeDoux songs
Songs written by Garth Brooks
Songs written by Mark D. Sanders
Song recordings produced by Allen Reynolds
Liberty Records singles
Song recordings produced by Jerry Crutchfield
Garth Brooks songs
Male vocal duets
1992 songs